Onur Aydın (born March 15, 1979 in İstanbul) is a Turkish professional basketball player, currently playing for Başkent Gençlik

He studied at Anadolu University.

References

1979 births
Living people
Centers (basketball)
Turkish men's basketball players
Beşiktaş men's basketball players
Mersin Büyükşehir Belediyesi S.K. players
Anadolu University alumni